Mistissini ( meaning Big Rock) is a Cree village municipality in the territory of Eeyou Istchee in northern Quebec, Canada; it has a distinct legal status and classification from other kinds of village municipalities in Quebec: Naskapi village municipalities, northern villages (Inuit communities), and ordinary villages.

As with all other Cree village municipalities in Quebec, there is a counterpart Cree reserved land of the same name located nearby: Mistissini.

Despite the title of "village municipality" and the formalities that go along with it (for instance, having a mayor), Statistics Canada lists it (and all other Cree village municipalities in Quebec) as having few resident population or residential infrastructure (dwellings); it is the Cree reserved lands that are listed as having most of the population and residential dwellings in the 2021 census, the 2016 census, and earlier censuses.

Geography 
The village is located on the Watso peninsula in the form of a large C (open to the northeast) attached to the east bank, forming the north-eastern shore of the Du Poste Bay, barring the exit of this bay and including the village of Mistissini in the North-West. A road connected to Route 167 serves this peninsula. The village is located at the mouth of the Du Poste Bay and in the southern part of Abatagouche Bay.

History 
The Crees have lived in the area of the watershed of the Rupert River and around Lake Mistassini for centuries. French explorers and traders entered it on the 17th of September. During the second half of this century, a trading post was established on Lake Mistassini. Its position changed from time to time until the Hudson's Bay Company established it at the current location of the village. The trading post was supplied by a canoe brigade at Fort Rupert (today Waskaganish) up the Rupert River or through Neoskweskau (a former Cree site) on the Eastmain River. The itinerary of the trip moved south - first by Oskelaneo when the railway was built in 1910, and later by the region of Lac Saint-Jean. The road reached Mistissini in 1970. Over time, Mistissini and the various posts in the area have been designated: "Maison Dorval", "Patagoosh", "Abatagoushe", "Mistassini" and "Baie-du-Poste" .

Demographics 

Languages 
In Mistissini, according to the Institut de la statistique du Québec, the most spoken language most often at home in 2011 out of a population of 3,405 inhabitants, is the Cree to 85.76%, the French to 2.35% and the English to 10.87%.

Gallery

See also
Nitchequon
Mistassini Lake, a waterbody

References

Cree village municipalities in Quebec
Populated places established in 1978
1978 establishments in Quebec